302 West 12th Street is a residential building facing west onto Abingdon Square Park in the Greenwich Village Historic District[1] on the west side of lower Manhattan in New York City, United States.

It was built by the developer brothers Bing & Bing with the architectural firm of Boak & Paris.  Russell M. Boak and Hyman F. Paris left the architectural firm of Emery Roth to start their own practice in 1927.

The building opened in the late summer of 1931 and currently houses 129 condominium apartments.

Development
It was part of a simultaneous development of five buildings in the area. Bing & Bing also worked with Boak and Paris on 45 Christopher Street.

They chose architect Emery Roth for both 299 West 12th Street and 59 West 12th Street.

And they chose to work with architect Robert T. Lyons on 2 Horatio Street.

Rivaling Central Park West
Leo Bing, announced on April 1, 1929, that his firm had quietly acquired 75 small lots and old buildings largely around Abingdon Square, Sheridan Square and Jackson Square Park.  And the lots would be combined to allow for a set of larger-scale, 17-story apartment buildings.

He said his goal was to "recreate the entire district as a modern counterpart of the high-class residential section it once was" saying it would "rival Central Park West and the fashionable east side within a few years."  He cited the goal of neighborhood reinvention as the reason for the simultaneous building, saying his hope was that "complete transformation of the section may be achieved as quickly as possible.”

Also, in more practical terms, he mentioned the "imminent" IND Eighth Avenue Line, and recent completion of the West Side Elevated Highway and even the Holland Tunnel as increasing accessibility to—and demand for—the area.

Despite the start of the Great Depression just months after Leo Bing's announcement, by September 1931  Bing & Bing reported that the "five new buildings on Christopher, Horatio and West Twelfth Streets are proving among the most popular of all the Bing & Bing apartment properties.  Callers have been numerous…and a high percentage of the space has been leased.”

Trivia
This building was featured in the 2006 feature film Lucky Number Slevin together with its sister building 299 West 12th Street.

References

External links
 Building website
 Emporis listing

Residential buildings completed in 1931
Apartment buildings in New York City
Residential buildings in Manhattan
Condominiums and housing cooperatives in Manhattan
Greenwich Village